The 2019 season is Sarpsborg 08's 8th season in Eliteserien, following their return to the top level in 2012.

Squad

Out on loan

Transfers

In

 Transfers announced on the above dates and finalised on 1 January 2019.

Loans in

Out

Loans out

Competitions

Eliteserien

Results summary

Results by round

Results

Table

Norwegian Cup

Squad statistics

Appearances and goals

|-
|colspan="14"|Players away from Sarpsborg 08 on loan:

|-
|colspan="14"|Players who left Sarpsborg 08 during the season:

|}

Goal scorers

Clean sheets

Disciplinary record

References

Sarpsborg 08 FF seasons
Sarpsborg 08